Liu Qing (born 28 April 1986 in Xuecheng, Shandong) is a Chinese middle-distance runner who specializes in the 800 and 1500 metres.

At the 2005 Summer Universiade she finished fourth in the 800 m and won a bronze in the 1500 m, and at the 2006 Asian Games she finished seventh and sixth. She competed in both events at the 2007 World Championships without reaching the final. She represented her country in the 1500 metres event at the 2008 Summer Olympics. At this event she led the pack at the early stages, perhaps to avoid being jostled by the bigger and bulkier competitors. Her early sprint robbed her of speed for the rest of the run and she was overtaken with some jostling and she lagged out of contention.

Her personal best 800 metres time is 1:59.74 minutes, achieved in October 2005 in Nanjing. In the 1500 metres she has 4:04.00 minutes, achieved in the same time and place.

References

Team China 2008

1986 births
Living people
Athletes (track and field) at the 2008 Summer Olympics
Chinese female middle-distance runners
Olympic athletes of China
People from Zaozhuang
Runners from Shandong
Athletes (track and field) at the 2006 Asian Games
Universiade medalists in athletics (track and field)
Universiade bronze medalists for China
Asian Games competitors for China
Medalists at the 2005 Summer Universiade